Sartal-e Dingu (also Romanized as Sartal-e Dīngū) is a village in Sadat Mahmudi Rural District, Pataveh District, Dana County, Kohgiluyeh and Boyer-Ahmad Province, Iran. At the 2006 census, its population was 138, in 30 families.

References 

Populated places in Dana County